Eoophyla polydora is a moth in the family Crambidae. It was described by Edward Meyrick in 1897. It is found on the Sangihe Islands of Indonesia.

References

Eoophyla
Moths described in 1897